The Lomi Hydroelectric Power Station ( or Lomi kraftstasjon) is a hydroelectric power station in the municipality of Fauske in Nordland county, Norway. Part of the water supplying the plant is runoff from the Sulitjelma Glacier. The plant is owned by Salten Kraftsamband and came into operation in 1979. The water is reused by the Sjønstå Hydroelectric Power Station further downstream in the Sulitjelma drainage system.

See also

References

Hydroelectric power stations in Norway
Fauske
Energy infrastructure completed in 1979
1979 establishments in Norway
Dams in Norway